Tamarack, formerly known as Camp Tamarack, is an unincorporated community in Calaveras County, California in the United States. It was founded in the 1920s. A nearby weather station, located across the Alpine County line, has been the site of several United States meteorological records.

Climate
Tamarack also holds the record for greatest seasonal snowfall in California: during the winter of 1906−1907, it received  of snow.

Tamarack has a subarctic climate (Köppen climate classification Dsc) with mild to warm summers coupled with chilly nights and moderately cold winter days with frigid nights and extremely heavy annual snowfall averaging .

References

Unincorporated communities in California
Unincorporated communities in Calaveras County, California